Carrasco Creek is a Uruguayan stream, separating Canelones Department and Montevideo Department. It flows from the Carrasco Swamps into the Río de la Plata.

It is one of the most contaminated water streams in the country.

See also
List of rivers of Uruguay

References

External links

Rivers of Uruguay
Rivers of Montevideo Department
Rivers of Canelones Department